Justin Travis McBride (born August 7, 1979) is an American former professional bull rider. In his career, he competed on the Professional Bull Riders (PBR) circuit. He was a two-time PBR World Champion (2005 and 2007), has a record 32 career PBR event wins, and was the first professional bull rider to earn more than $5 million in the course of his career. McBride was inducted into the PBR’s Ring of Honor in 2009 and the Bull Riding Hall of Fame in 2020.

Since retiring from bull riding, he has been a color commentator for the PBR's Premier Series (known as the Unleash the Beast Series since 2018) telecasts on CBS Sports Network. He also had a brief country music singer-songwriter career.

Early and personal life 
Justin McBride was born in Texas and lived in Belton, Texas until he later moved to Mullen, Nebraska with his parents and older brother. His father, who worked on a ranch, rode bulls; his maternal grandfather was killed in a bull-riding event the year before McBride was born. McBride excelled at bareback horse and bull riding, played eight-man football and wrestled. He attended the University of Nevada, Las Vegas on a rodeo scholarship; he left after a year to go pro at 19.

McBride currently lives in Whitesboro, Texas with his wife and two children.

Contestant career
McBride recalls his debut in the PBR's rookie league, the Challenger Tour, as 'rough'. When he qualified for the main PBR tour in 1999 (then known as the Bud Light Cup Series), he finished fourth in his first-ever  premier series event, which was held in Bakersfield, California. He claimed his first win in his next event, which was in Odessa, Texas. Coupled with two more third-place finishes (one in Albuquerque, New Mexico and one in Reno, Nevada), he qualified for his first PBR World Finals and finished fourteenth in the world in his rookie year of 1999, with $89,007 in earnings.

In 2000, McBride had several top finishes, but no wins. His big success of that year came when he won the Mossy Oak shootout twice - once in Greensboro, North Carolina for $15,000, and again in Houston, Texas for $30,000. He finished ninth in the world in 2000, with $144,764 in earnings, and was named the Mossy Oak Shootout Champion that year.

In 2001, McBride stepped up his game and won 5 events that year, putting himself into a three-man race for the PBR World Championship title against Adriano Moraes and Ty Murray. Unfortunately for McBride, he faltered at the finals (as did Murray) and the Brazilian, Moraes, ended up winning his second world title that year. McBride finished third in the world that year, winning  $302,217 for his efforts.

In 2002, McBride did not get to match the success he had in 2001, but he still won the Bud Light Cup event in Nashville, Tennessee and finished fifth in the world overall that year. He made $181,546 that year.

2003 saw a whole new Justin McBride. He put himself into a tight two-man race between himself and Chris Shivers for the world title that year, winning two Built Ford Tough Series events in the process (Anaheim, California and St. Louis, Missouri). McBride was in the lead for the world title going into the Grand Rapids, Michigan Built Ford Tough series, but unfortunately, disaster struck. He was stepped on by a bull named Mission Pack in the short-go of that event, breaking two ribs and puncturing a lung. Many thought McBride would not make it to the finals, but he did go. He won the first go-round and very nearly took the title away from Shivers, but when McBride bucked off of Mossy Oak Mudslinger in the short-go of the finals, Shivers was awarded the PBR World title and the first ever million-dollar bonus that was awarded to a world champion. McBride finished 2nd overall in 2003 with $281,606 in earnings.

In 2004, McBride picked up where he left off and won 4 events that year. His main rivals for the world title that year were Adriano Moraes and Mike Lee. He stayed in 2nd place for most of the year, but due to a new points system implemented for the Finals that year, it would be possible for him to catch the leader (who at that point was Adriano, who had a 1,800-point lead heading into the finals). However, for the second year in a row, disaster struck again for McBride in Grand Rapids. This time, in that event's Mossy Oak Shootout, the bull named Lefty stepped on his right ankle as he was bucked off, breaking it. McBride would need surgery and again, people thought he would not make it to the finals. He did, three weeks later, and turned in some heroic performances early on. Unfortunately, he bucked off his last few bulls and ended up 4th in the world overall that year. He made $303,928 in 2004. Lee would go on to win the PBR world championship that year in a historic come-from-behind performance.

In 2005, McBride would not be denied. He won 6 Built Ford Tough series events, tying a record originally set by Cody Hart in 1999 (the same year Hart won his PBR world title). In the middle of the year he found himself in a heated race for the PBR World Title with Brazilian rider Guilherme Marchi. The two battled it out at the PBR World Finals, and the short-go actually came down to Marchi and McBride. The pressure was on McBride after Marchi successfully made the whistle on the bull Kid Rock. McBride answered by hanging for dear life to the bull Camo, off the side for much of the ride, but nevertheless rode the bull successfully. McBride had overcome adversity and finally won his first-ever PBR World Title in 2005, with over $1.5 million in earnings for the year, a PBR record. His final ride was on a bull named Camo (oddly, McBride would win the title in 2007 on that same bull), and the ride was notable for the fact that McBride spent most of the needed eight seconds literally hanging off the side of the bull.

With the monkey off his back, McBride decided he'd have fun in 2006. He maintained a consistent riding average and had several top finishes. In the middle of the year he took time off to spend with his wife, Jill, who gave birth to their new daughter, Addisen Claire McBride. McBride took six events off, but when he came back, he was still in the mix for a world title. He won 3 BFTS events upon his return (and in 2 events rode 2 previously-unridden bulls in the short-go rounds), but the Finals did not go as well as he had hoped. He still earned $232,757 that year and finished 6th overall.

In 2007, McBride chased a second world title. He won a record 8 events on the BFTS that year, and battled it out with 2nd-year pro J.B. Mauney for the world title. At the BFTS event in Chihuahua, Mexico, McBride hung up to the bull named Gnash and suffered a serious left shoulder injury that was first meant to put him out for the year, but he then came back two events later in Greensboro, North Carolina, to win his eighth event of the year, which is the new PBR record for most events won in a single season. He was also named the Alphatrade National Champion of 2007 and chose to ride the bull, Scene of the Crash, for 200,000 dollars, making it the richest ride in PBR history. He finished this season by winning his second PBR title in three years. As in 2005, he did it riding a bull named Camo in the final round; unlike in 2005, McBride stayed on top of the bull without hanging on the side. His total season earnings in 2007 was $1,836,002. Due to the shoulder injury, though, McBride elected to have surgery after the Finals, and was out of competition for about 6 months after the surgery.

McBride came back to the Built Ford Tough Series at the 2008 Dickies American Worker of the Year Invitational in Dallas, Texas, and, finishing 7th overall at the event, seemed to pick up where he left off. He showed the world he was back for sure when he won the very next event, which was the Express Classic in Tulsa, Oklahoma, pocketing over $30,000 in that one weekend. He later went on to win the Jack Daniels Invitational in Nashville, Tennessee, and in doing so, secured himself yet another qualification for the PBR World Finals. A few events later, McBride achieved another milestone, breaking the $5 million mark in PBR career earnings, the first rider to ever do so. However, shortly before the finals, having qualified 15th in the standings, McBride announced that he would retire at the end of the season to concentrate on his second career in country music, saying, "I don't wanna do it anymore." He put on a show at the 2008 PBR Finals, riding 5 out of 8 bulls (including two go-round wins) to finish 6th overall at the event. His final ride saw him bucked off Voodoo Child, the bull that he rode in Tulsa for the event win earlier in the year, ending his final season ranked 21st in the world with $221,090 in earnings. McBride acknowledged the crowd and walked away happy that he would not have to ride again.

However, McBride did come out of retirement for two more special bull rides. In 2014, at a special event known as RFD-TV's "The American", which was held at AT&T Stadium in Arlington, Texas, he faced off against NFL defensive end Jared Allen's bull, Air Time, in a bonus ride, but was bucked off in less than 2 seconds. Then, on May 30, 2015, he competed in a special event called "Unfinished Business" (which took place during the J.W. Hart Challenge at the Wise County Sheriff's Posse Arena in Decatur, Texas), which featured McBride and other PBR legends coming back to attempt one more bull; there, he was bucked off a bull called Oyster Creek in just over 3 seconds.

Event wins

1999
 Top Guns Bull Riding Champion (Odessa, Texas)

2001
 Ty Murray Invitational Champion (Albuquerque, New Mexico)
 Colorado Open Co-Champion (Colorado Springs, Colorado)
 Grand Rapids Open Champion (Grand Rapids, Michigan)
 Justin Bull Riding Champion (Houston, Texas)
 Baltimore Open Champion (Baltimore, Maryland)

2002
 Bullnanza Nashville Champion (Nashville, Tennessee)

2003
 Anaheim Open Champion (Anaheim, California)
 St. Louis Open Champion (St. Louis, Missouri)

2004
 Phoenix Invitational Champion (Phoenix, Arizona)
 Jerome Davis Challenge Co-Champion (Greensboro, North Carolina)
 Indianapolis Invitational Champion (Indianapolis, Indiana)
 Tacoma Classic Champion (Tacoma, Washington)

2005
 Worcester Open Co-Champion (Worcester, Massachusetts)
 Jacksonville Open Co-Champion (Jacksonville, Florida)
 St. Louis Open Champion (St. Louis, Missouri)
 Heart of the West Ford Stores Invitational Champion (Reno, Nevada)
 Ty Murray Invitational Co-Champion (Albuquerque, New Mexico)
 NILE Invitational Champion (Billings, Montana)

2006
 Fritos Invitational Champion (Dallas, Texas)
 U.S. Army Invitational Champion (Reading, Pennsylvania)
 Rocky Boots Invitational Champion (Columbus, Ohio)

2007
 Sacramento Classic Champion (Sacramento, California)
 Southern Ford Dealers Invitational Champion (Tampa, Florida)
 New Orleans Classic Champion (New Orleans, Louisiana)
 Cabela's Classic Champion (Kansas City, Missouri)
 Cabela's Shootout Champion (Omaha, Nebraska)
 Built Ford Tough Invitational Champion (Auburn Hills, Michigan)
 Dickies Invitational Champion (Dallas, Texas)
 U.S. Army Invitational Champion (Greensboro, North Carolina)

2008
 Express Classic Champion (Tulsa, Oklahoma)
 Jack Daniels Invitational Champion (Nashville, Tennessee)

Music career

In 2007, McBride started a career as a country music singer. Just a week before the 2007 PBR Finals, he released his debut album, Don't Let Go.

On August 14, 2009, he performed at the Grand Ole Opry.

On October 19, 2010, McBride released his first live CD/DVD, Live at Billy Bob's Texas, which includes the single "Tonight Ain't the Day".

In October 2012, McBride released his second studio album, Everybody Loves a Cowboy.

Discography

Don't Let Go (2007)
Track Listing:
 Don't Let Go
 Tumbleweed Town
 Beer Drinkin' Song
 Bigger Fish to Fry
 That Was Us
 Went For a Ride
 Cowboy 'Til I Die
 It Takes a Lot
 God's In Oklahoma Today
 Good Saddles Ain't Cheap
 Tough
 Love Me If You Can

Live at Billy Bob's Texas (live CD/DVD; October 19, 2010)
Everybody Loves a Cowboy (October 2012)
Track Listing:
 Everybody Loves a Cowboy 
 A Fire That Just Won't Burn 
 It Makes Me Lean 
 Highways and Honky 
 Lovin' Me Look Easy 
 Bandy the Rodeo Clown 
 Never Gets Lonely Here
 That's Why I'm Here
 Too Late to Save the World
 Hair of the Dog
 It's Sure Been a Good Ride

Coaching career
In 2022, McBride became the head coach of the Nashville Stampede, one of eight bull riding teams of the PBR’s Team Series, which debuted that year. The Stampede ended up winning the inaugural PBR Team Series championship.

Honors
In 2009, McBride was honored with the Ring of Honor, the PBR's equivalent of a hall of fame award. In 2016, he was inducted into the Texas Cowboy Hall of Fame. In 2020, he was inducted into the Bull Riding Hall of Fame.

References

External links

Official Website
Career stats at pbr.com

Bull riders
1979 births
Living people
People from Hooker County, Nebraska
American male singer-songwriters
American country singer-songwriters
People from Elk City, Oklahoma
Singer-songwriters from Oklahoma
University of Nevada, Las Vegas alumni
Rodeo announcers
People from Belton, Texas
People from Whitesboro, Texas
21st-century American singers
Country musicians from Texas
Country musicians from Oklahoma
21st-century American male singers
Professional Bull Riders: Heroes and Legends
Singer-songwriters from Texas
Singer-songwriters from Nebraska